Sporting Love is a 1936 British musical comedy film directed by J. Elder Wills and starring Stanley Lupino, Laddie Cliff and Lu Ann Meredith. It was made at Beaconsfield Studios. It was based on the musical Sporting Love which Stanley Lupino had written and starred in. Lupino had broken with British International Pictures to make a couple of independent films, but after this he returned to BIP.

Plot
Two brothers in a continual trough of financial depression try to tackle their money problems.

Cast
 Stanley Lupino as Percy Brace  
 Laddie Cliff as Peter Brace  
 Eda Peel as Maude Dane  
 Lu Ann Meredith as Nellie Gray 
 Bobbie Comber as Gerald Dane  
 Henry Carlisle as Lord Dimsdale  
 Clarissa Selwynne as Aunt Fanny  
 Wyn Weaver as Wilfred Wimple  
 Barry Lupino 
 Arty Ash
 Syd Crossley 
 Merle Tottenham as Maid

Critical reception
In 1940, Pathescope Monthly called it "A lively comedy you will enjoy!"

References

Bibliography
 Low, Rachael. Filmmaking in 1930s Britain. George Allen & Unwin, 1985.
 Wood, Linda. British Films, 1927-1939. British Film Institute, 1986.

External links

1936 films
British musical comedy films
1936 musical comedy films
Films shot at Beaconsfield Studios
Films directed by J. Elder Wills
Films set in England
British black-and-white films
Hammer Film Productions films
Films scored by Jack Beaver
1930s English-language films
1930s British films